Bisikani/Soparibeu Kabin Rural LLG is a local-level government (LLG) of Manus Province, Papua New Guinea.

Wards
01. Salien
02. Nihon
03. Kali
04. Maso
05. Matahai
06. Salapai
07. Lessau
08. Harengau
09. Jowan 1
10. Jowan 2
11. Nyada
12. Levei
13. Sori 2
14. Sori 1

References

Local-level governments of Manus Province